Jacob Fichman also transliterated as Yakov Fichman (25 November 1881 – 18 May 1958), was an acclaimed Hebrew poet, essayist and literary critic.

Biography
Fichman was born in Bălți, Bessarabia, Moldova in 1881. He initially emigrated to Ottoman Palestine in 1912, but returned temporarily to Europe and was stranded there until after World War I, not returning to the then Mandate Palestine, later Israel, until 1919. where he died in 1958.

Fichman's poetry followed a traditional lyric Romantic style. His poetic background is reflected in his works of prose, which were sometimes seen as being nearly works of poetry in themselves. His other work included textbooks, articles in periodicals and introductions in literary anthologies. His critical essays focused heavily on the lives of the authors rather than on focusing directly on their work, giving the reader a holistic view of the author and the work.

Awards 
 In 1945, Fichman received the Bialik Prize for his book of poetry Peat Sadeh ("A Corner of a Field"), published in 1943.
 In 1953, Fichman again received the Bialik Prize, this time in respect of several of his works.
 In 1957, Fichman was awarded the Israel Prize, for literature.

See also 
List of Israel Prize recipients
List of Bialik Prize recipients
Fichman

References

Further reading
The Modern Hebrew Poem Itself (2003), 
History of Jewish Literature 1930 (1941),

External links
 

1881 births
1958 deaths
Jewish poets
Hebrew-language poets
Israel Prize in literature recipients
Israeli Jews
Israeli poets
Romanian emigrants to Mandatory Palestine
Israeli people of Romanian-Jewish descent
Romanian Jews
Jews in Mandatory Palestine
Jews in Ottoman Palestine
20th-century poets
Burials at Trumpeldor Cemetery